The Women's 60 metres event  at the 2006 IAAF World Indoor Championships was held on March 10.

Medalists

Results

Heats
First 4 of each heat (Q) and next 4 fastest (q) qualified for the semifinals.

Semifinals

Final

References

Results

60
60 metres at the World Athletics Indoor Championships
2006 in women's athletics